Abbad ibn Abd Allah ibn al-Zubayr al-Asadi was a Tabi'un and one of the narrators of the Prophet's hadith, and the judge of Mecca during the era of his father, a Caliph of Zubayrids and Companion Abd Allah ibn al-Zubayr, and his paternal grandfather are Zubayr ibn al-Awwam, famous Companions of the Prophet.

Biography 
Abbad was taught and influenced by various Companions of the Prophet, such as Umar, his grandmother Asma bint Abi Bakr, his grandmother's sister and wife of prophet Muhammad, Aisha, along with the prophet scribe Zayd ibn Thabit and his own father Abd Allah ibn al-Zubayr.

His students, to whom he narrated the Hadith, were his son Yahya, 'Abd al-Wahid ibn Hamza ibn 'Abd Allah, Hisham ibn Urwah, his cousin Muhammad ibn Ja'far ibn al-Zubayr, and 'Abd Allah ibn 'Ubayd Allah ibn Abi Mulayka.

Hadith 
Hadith scholars deem Abbad as an authentic and trustworthy narrator  of hadith.

Abi Dawud narrated  Abdullah ibn Ubaydullah ibn Umayr narrated during the time of Second Fitna, 'Abbad were asking Abdullah ibn Umar: We have heard that the evening meal is taken just before the night prayer. Thereupon Abdullah ibn Umar replied: "Woe to you! what was their evening meal? Do you think it was like the meal of your father?" Muhammad Nasiruddin al-Albani deemed this narration has good chain(Hasan)

Sahih Muslim also recorded 'Abbad  narrated hadith from Aisha: A person came to the Messenger of Allah (ﷺ), and he then narrated the hadith. But (neither these words are found):" Give charity, give charity" (nor) his words:" during the time".

Yahya, his son who also hadith narrator, reported some hadiths from his father.

Ibn Hisham narrates from Yahya through Abbad, that regarding Talhah, one of the ten Companions who have been promised paradise, were praised by prophet Muhammad and being promised Paradise for his assistance during the Battle of Uhud.

While Ibn Hisham also wrote his commentary from Ibn Ishaq that during Battle of the Trench, Safiyya bint Abd al-Muttalib, mother of az-Zubayr, ancestor of Yahya, used an iron staff to kill a Jewish interloper with who want to betray the Muslims and slips in to the refugee fortress which contained wives, elders, and children of the Muslim soldiers who fought on the frontline.

Ababda 
According to traditional sources, Ababda people claims their lineage came from Zubayr ibn al-Awwam through the line of Abbad as their common ancestor. Abbad bore four children who would form the subdivisions of the Ababda tribe, in accordance to modern day researchers from Egypt, that  Zubayrid Ababda were supposedly descended from the line of Abbad from his father, Abdullah ibn al-Zubayr.

See also 
Sahaba
The Ten Promised Paradise
Sunni view of the Sahaba

References

Bibliography 
 
 
 

Tabi‘un hadith narrators
7th-century Iranian people
Scholars from the Umayyad Caliphate
Sunni Muslim scholars of Islam
People from the Rashidun Caliphate